Hockey Club Avangard (Vanguard), also known as Avangard Omsk, is a Russian professional ice hockey team from Omsk. It is a member of the Chernyshev Division in the Eastern Conference of the Kontinental Hockey League (KHL).

Franchise history

Early years of Omsk hockey (1950–1972)
The first amateur ice hockey teams in Omsk began to appear in 1950, formed by local bandy players. One of them was a hockey section of the Omsk Spartak sports society. Spartak Omsk was chosen to be the first Omsk hockey team in the 1950–51 RSFSR championship. In the 1955–56 season, the team had a chance to represent the city in the Soviet Championship, joining its then-second level Class B league and recruiting the best hockey players from Omsk. Four seasons later, the team finally won promotion to the top division.

Its first game in the major Soviet championship Spartak played on November 29, 1959, against Spartak (later Avtomobilist) Sverdlovsk. The first goal for Avangard was scored by Viktor Shevelev. In 1962, the team was assigned with a trade union of the Omsk airport and renamed as Aeroflot Omsk. Playing under its new name, the Omsk team reached 13th place overall, its highest success during the original four-season run in the top level of Soviet hockey. However, it was still not enough to secure their position in Class A after the subsequent reform of the championship—starting with the 1963–64 season, Aeroflot joined a newly established A2 league.

Further realignment in 1966 drove Aeroflot out to the third level competition (the third group of Class A). The next season, 1967–68, the team was renamed once again as Kauchuk (Rubber) reflecting the change of the team's assignment to the Sibirsky Kauchuk combine. Shortly after, for the 1969–70 season, the team was taken over by Yevgeny Babich, who finished his coaching career in Omsk.

Late Soviet era (1972–1991)
In order to improve the performance of Omsk in the Soviet championship, Kauchuk, in 1972, was merged with rival Lokomotiv Omsk into a single team called Khimik ("Chemist"). It led to an immediate promotion of the team in 1973. The next season was notable for being the first in the second level league after a seven years break, as well as the first to be played on artificial ice, although the games were still held at an outdoor stadium.

In 1975, Khimik Omsk was given to the Omsk Tire Factory and subsequently was renamed Shinnik ("Tiremaker"). In 1981, the team then affiliated with Omsktransmash and received its current name, Avangard Omsk. In 1987, the players moved to the long-awaited Irtysh Sports Complex, the team's first indoor arena.

Major league breakthrough (1991–1997)
In 1990, after 27 years of balancing between the second and the third divisions of Soviet hockey, Avangard was finally given the opportunity to play in the qualification tournament for the top league. Even though Omsk players were not successful at the time, the team was ultimately promoted to the top league after the 1991 series and joined the first and the last CIS championship. During that season, Leonid Kiselev's Avangard surpassed the success of the 1960s Aeroflot, rising up to 12th place in the league.

Kiselev continued to coach Avangard on its way to become an acknowledged major club in the International Hockey League. For its inaugural season, the team was joined by Evgeni Shastin, a 1980s Soviet hockey star and an Omsk hockey school alumnus. Finishing third in the Eastern Conference, Omsk went on to the playoffs and advanced to the quarterfinals. After a lacklustre 1993–94 season, Avangard repeated that success in 1995 becoming second in the East and returning to the quarterfinals, where it was eventually defeated by that year's champions, Dynamo Moscow.

The history of the 1990s' Avangard team culminated in the 1995–96 season. Despite finishing second in the Eastern Conference, the team was tied in points with Ufa's Salavat Yulaev after the final round (it was the only IHL season when the championship was decided separately from the cup playoffs), which led to a minor conflict between the teams and the league that was resolved when both Avangard and Salavat receiving bronze medals. The main stars of that first-ever medal roster of Omsk were Nikolai Marinenko, Oleg Kryazhev and Andrei Rasolko.

During the next season, the first in the newly established Superleague of the Russian Championship, Avangard was joined by forward Maxim Sushinsky, the most successful player of the upcoming era in the club's history.

Omsk Hawks (1997–2008)
After Kiselev's departure in October 1997, Anatoly Bardin became the team's new president, while IHL Cup-winning Head Coach Vladimir Golubovich took the head coach position. By the end of the season, the team finished sixth overall, but for the second season in a row lost in the quarterfinals to Metallurg Magnitogorsk. In the 1998–99 season, the newly refreshed Avangard launched a rebranding campaign under the Omskie Yastreby (Омские Ястребы, Omsk Hawks) banner, changing the logo to the present design and the team colours to black and red. Omsk ended up fourth in the regular championship tying with Dynamo Moscow and became third in the league by attendance, but yet again could not progress past the semifinals after a 2–1 series defeat to Torpedo Yaroslavl. In 1999, Golubovich's team also reached third in the IIHF Continental Cup, the second-level pan-European ice hockey club tournament, tying in points with that year's champions HC Ambrì-Piotta of Switzerland.

In the course of the 1999–2000 season, the club opted to switch coaches in favour of Gennady Tsygurov, who came to rebuild the team, turning to a young generation of local Omsk players, including future talents such as Alexander Svitov and Egor Shastin. Even though the replacement damaged the club's position in the season table and failed to help Avangard progress past the quarterfinals against rivals Metallurg Magnitogorsk, the team's line of Dmitry Zatonsky, Ravil Yakubov and Maxim Sushinsky still finished the year as the most productive line in the league. During Tsygurov's tenure, Yakubov was later replaced by Alexander Prokopiev to form one of the most potent lines in the club's history. In the 2001–02 season, Avangard's top trio was named the most productive line of the league. Its leader, Maxim Sushinsky, became a playoff MVP in both the 2000–01 and 2001–02 seasons, also being picked for the 2002 Superleague All-Star Team. In 2000–01, the Hawks were also joined by native Omsk defenceman Kirill Koltsov, that season's rookie of the year. In 2001, the team led by Sushinsky became the first Avangard team to reach the championship finals but lost to Magnitogorsk 4–2. The next season was less successful for Omsk as they were once again stopped in the semifinals by Magnitogorsk.

During the early 2000s, Avangard became one of the first Russian hockey clubs to invite high-profile foreign players. Prior to the 2001–02 season, they signed 2000 World Championship MVP Martin Procházka and in 2002, he was joined by two more Czech national team players—Pavel Patera and Tomáš Vlasák. Former teammates with HC Kladno and AIK IF Patera and Procházka formed an all-Czech forward line for Omsk. The team's Czech reinforcement of 2002 was finalized when famed Olympic-winning coach Ivan Hlinka became Avangard's new head coach.

Despite relative success of Hlinka's Avangard in both regular season and postseason performance, the line of Procházka Patera and Vlasák line was named the most productive line in the league, with Vlasák leading the league in points. During the year's playoffs, in the quarterfinals against Dynamo Moscow, Avangard became the first RSL team ever to win a series after being behind two games to none. During the 2003 playoffs' semifinals, the team was not able to defeat a significantly weaker Severstal Cherepovets team and eventually lost the third-place series to Magnitogorsk. Finishing the season, Hlinka decided to retire as a coach in favour of his career as an agent.

Avangard Omsk won the RSL title in 2004, which qualified them for the inaugural IIHF European Champions Cup. They would be the first winners of that competition, beating Kärpät from the Finnish SM-liiga.

Metallurg Magnitogorsk, Sibir Novosibirsk, Salavat Yulaev Ufa, Ak Bars Kazan and, to a lesser extent, Vityaz Chekhov, are considered to be Avangard's fiercest rivals in the KHL.

KHL history (2008–)

2008–09
This season is considered to be one of the worst in franchise history, with the club's reputation being tarnished both on and off the ice. During the summer, Anatoly Bardin, Omsk's general manager, was kept busy bringing 18 new players in, including former Pittsburgh Penguins superstar Jaromír Jágr, goaltender John Grahame and forward Stanislav Chistov.

After an unconvincing start, Head Coach Sergey Gersonskiy was fired just six games into the season. He would later start legal proceedings against the club to obtain the compensation that he was allegedly entitled to under his contract. After a number of hearings and appeals, Gersonskiy was awarded 1 million rubles, only a small proportion of what he originally claimed. The Canadian Wayne Fleming was promptly appointed as new head coach.

On October 13, 2008, young Avangard forward Alexei Cherepanov died after collapsing on the bench during a game against Vityaz Chekhov. He played a shift with teammate Jaromír Jágr, and the two were talking on the bench shortly after they left the ice when Cherepanov suddenly collapsed. After being attended to on the bench, he was carried to the dressing room where he was revived for several brief moments before finally being rushed to an intensive care unit, though it was too late. The ambulance that was normally at all games had already departed and had to be called back; doctors arrived on the scene 12 minutes after Cherepanov collapsed, and the battery on the defibrillator used to attempt to shock Cherepanov's heart back to life was drained. It took approximately 20 minutes to get him to a hospital. While in the care of Chekhov doctors, he was again resuscitated briefly on two occasions before ultimately passing.

On December 29, 2008, Russian investigators revealed that he suffered from myocarditis, a condition where not enough blood reaches the heart, and that he should not have been playing hockey professionally. The federal Investigative Committee also announced that a chemical analysis of Cherepanov's blood and urine samples allowed experts to conclude "that for several months Alexei Cherepanov engaged in doping." Official sources have stated the banned substance taken was nikethamide, a stimulant, and that it had been taken three hours prior to the game in which he passed.

Avangard Director Mikhail Denisov has since been fired, whereas the league Disciplinary Committee has since removed Omsk's doctors from that role with the club, and has requested the suspension of General Manager Anatoly Bardin and Avangard President Konstantin Potapov until the investigation being conducted by the Russian Federal Prosecutor's Office was concluded. Anatoly Bardin was eventually reinstated as the club's GM.

Meanwhile, Avangard's poor performance on the ice continued. This resulted in a bizarre incident when Anatoly Bardin asked Wayne Fleming to leave the bench during the second intermission of a home game against Vityaz Chekhov. In just under a month, the head coach was relieved of his duties, replaced by the inexperienced Igor Nikitin. Having finished the regular season on the 16th place, Avangard only just managed to qualify for the playoffs. However, the team surprised everyone by knocking the regular season champions Salavat Yulaev Ufa out of the competition by winning three games to one. Moreover, the team was just 15 seconds away from defeating Ak Bars Kazan, the future champion of 2009, in the second round but failed to hold on to their one-goal lead and went on to concede an overtime goal in the deciding match at TatNeft Arena.

2009–10
The club made a few solid roster additions by signing Karri Rämö with Lasse Kukkonen in the summer and Anton Babchuk with Denis Kulyash during the season. A lack of quality in the forward position, however, soon became apparent on the team, as Head Coach Igor Nikitin was struggling to find players matching Jaromír Jágr's ability to play on the first line, and the team found it difficult to achieve the results that fans expected.

On January 9, 2010, a massive brawl broke out in a game against Vityaz Chekhov. The initial conflict began during pre-game warm-ups, when Darcy Verot intentionally shot a puck at Lasse Kukkonen, prompting Alexander Svitov to stand up for his teammate, Kukkonen. Soon after the game began, Brandon Sugden challenged Svitov to a fight, which then escalated to involve all other eight skaters on the ice. A number of other fights then ensued, resulting in a bench- and penalty-box clearing brawl. The officials were forced to suspend the game just after three minutes and 39 seconds in the first period as only four players between the two sides were left to play the game. A world-record total of 840 penalty minutes were incurred during the game. In the game's wake, the KHL imposed heavy fines on both organizations, multiple players on both teams and both clubs' head coaches, as well as deciding to suspend six Vityaz players and Avangard's Dmitri Vlasenkov, who was first to leave the bench during a fight. The KHL also credited the game as a 5–0 defeat for both teams, with no points being awarded.

The brawl, however, appeared to give the team a morale boost as they went on to win the next six games. Nonetheless, mediocrity soon returned, and Nikitin was fired and replaced by Raimo Summanen just hours before the playoffs started. The new head coach failed to deliver as the team suffered three-straight defeats at the hands of Neftekhimik Nizhnekamsk and was eliminated in the first round.

Season-by-season record
Note: GP = Games played, W = Wins, OTW = Overtime/shootout wins, OTL = Overtime/shootout losses, L = Losses, GF = Goals for, GA = Goals against, Pts = Points

Players and personnel

Current roster

Head coaches

Honored members

Sponsors and partners 
In 2009, Gazprom Neft started partnership cooperation with Avangard hockey club, which includes support and development of youth and children teams. During the 12-year period of cooperation, the main team regularly played in the Gagarin Cup play-offs, made it to the finals twice, and won the KHL Championship and got the Gagarin Cup in 2020-2021 season.

Within the framework of this cooperation, Gazprom Neft promotes the company's brands, supports the development of the club academy, and in 2020 it started the construction of the new home arena for the club jointly with the federal government.

Franchise records and leaders

Scoring leaders

These are the top-ten point-scorers in franchise history. Figures are updated after each completed KHL regular season.

Note: Pos = Position; GP = Games played; G = Goals; A = Assists; Pts = Points; P/G = Points per game ;  = current Avangard player''

Honors

Champions
  Gagarin Cup: 2021
  Russian Superleague: 2004
  KHL Continental Cup: 2011
  Opening Cup: 2019-20, 2021-22
  IIHF European Champions Cup: 2005
  Soviet League Class A2: 1990

Runners-up
  Gagarin Cup: 2012, 2019
  Russian Superleague: 2001, 2006
  Russian Superleague: 2007
  IIHF Continental Cup: 2007
  IHL: 1996

References

External links

  
 NHL.com article on Omsk

 
Ice hockey teams in Russia
Sport in Omsk
Kontinental Hockey League teams
Chernyshev Division (KHL)